

List of Ambassadors

Shlomit Sufa
Shani Cooper 2018 - 
Emanuel Mehl 2015 - 2018
Sharon Bar-Li 2011 - 2015
Yaacov-Jack Revach 1986 - 1987
Yoav Bar-On 1984 - 1986
Mordehay Avgar 1973
Avraham Cohen 1967 - 1973
Mordechai Shalev 1965 - 1967
Michael Arnon 1962 - 1965
Moshe Bitan 1960 - 1962
Ehud Avriel 1957 - 1960

References

Ghana
Israel